Solitaire Royale is a collection of solitaire games published by Spectrum HoloByte in 1987 for the Apple IIGS, MS-DOS, Macintosh, and Amiga. The eight games included are 3 Shuffles and a Draw, Pyramid, Golf, Corners, Reno, Klondike, Canfield, and Calculation. There are also three children's games: Pairs, The Wish, and Concentration.

Gameplay
Solitaire Royale is a computer solitaire card-game simulation. The game features colorful card-back designs, digitized sounds of cards shuffling, and eight solitaire games included. The game features a tournament competition where the challenge is to accumulate the highest total score upon playing all eight games in a row, with the two combatants receiving exactly the same deal. When a solitaire game is won, fireworks are displayed.

Reception
The game received 5 out of 5 stars in Dragon #141 in "The Role of Computers" column.

Reviews
ACE (Advanced Computer Entertainment) - Dec, 1987
ASM (Aktueller Software Markt) - May, 1988

References

External links
Solitaire Royale at Lemon Amiga
Solitaire Royale at MobyGames
Review in Compute!
Review in Info

1987 video games
Amiga games
Apple IIGS games
Classic Mac OS games
DOS games
FM-7 games
FM Towns games
MSX2 games
NEC PC-8801 games
NEC PC-9801 games
Patience video games
Sharp X1 games
Spectrum HoloByte games
Video games developed in the United States